Jarmila is a Slavic origin female given name. Derived from the Slavic elements jary fierce, strong and mil favour. Similar names are Jaromíra and Jaroslava. Nicknames are Jarka, Jarcza, Jara, Jarina, Jaromilka, Jarmilka, Mila, Jarulinka. 
The meaning of the name is derived from word "bujarý" which means sprightly, hilarious.

Name days 
Czech: 4 February
Slovak: 28 April

Notable people 
Jarmila Jeřábková (1912–1989), Czech dancer, choreographer and teacher
Jarmila Klimešová (born 1981), Czech javelin thrower
Jarmila Kratochvílová (born 1951), Czech track and field runner
Jarmila Loukotková (1923-2007), Czech writer and author
Jarmila Machačová (born 1986), Czech racing cyclist
Jarmila Müllerová (1901-1944), Czech swimmer
Jarmila Novotná (1907-1994), Czech actress and soprano singer
Jarmila Nygrýnová (1953-1999), Czech long jumper
Jarmila Pacherová, Czechoslovak slalom canoeist
Jarmila Wolfe (born 1987), Slovak-born Australian tennis player

Fictional characters 
Jarmila, in the poem Máj by Karel Hynek Mácha

See also

Slavic names

External links 
Jarmila -> Czechoslovak Film Database

Feminine given names
Czech feminine given names
Polish feminine given names
Slovak feminine given names
Slavic feminine given names